Julius Wolff was a member of the Wisconsin State Assembly.

Biography
Wolff was born on April 19, 1818. He died on March 22, 1879, and would be buried in Franklin, Sheboygan County, Wisconsin.

His son, George W. Wolff, would become a member of the Assembly and the Wisconsin State Senate.

Career
Wolff represented the 4th District of Sheboygan County, Wisconsin in the Assembly during the 1866 session. He was affiliated with the National Union Party.

References

External links
Find a Grave

People from Sheboygan County, Wisconsin
Republican Party members of the Wisconsin State Assembly
1818 births
1879 deaths
Burials in Wisconsin
19th-century American politicians